Brittan Golden (born July 20, 1988) is a former American football wide receiver. He played college football at West Texas A&M. After going undrafted after the 2012 NFL Draft, he was signed by the Chicago Bears. He also spent time with the Jacksonville Jaguars, Arizona Cardinals, and New York Giants.

Professional career

Chicago Bears (first stint)
Golden signed with the Chicago Bears as an undrafted free agent on April 29, 2012. In the final preseason game against the Cleveland Browns, Golden returned a blocked punt 22 yards for a touchdown. However, he was waived on August 31.

Jacksonville Jaguars
Golden was signed to the Jacksonville Jaguars' practice squad on December 18, 2012.

Chicago Bears (second stint)
On January 4, 2013, Golden was brought back by the Bears. He was among the final roster cuts on August 30.

Arizona Cardinals
Golden was signed to the Arizona Cardinals' practice squad on September 17, 2013. Later the same season Golden was promoted 53-man roster. The Cardinals released Golden on August 30, 2014. He was signed back to the active roster on December 16, 2014.

On September 3, 2016, Golden was released by the Cardinals and was signed to the practice squad the next day. He was promoted to the active roster on October 4, 2016. He caught his first career touchdown in Week 14 on a 9-yard pass from Carson Palmer. He played in 12 games with one start in 2016, recording eight receptions for 82 yards and one touchdown.

Golden played in 13 games in 2017, recording five receptions for 70 yards. He suffered a broken arm in Week 15 and was placed on injured reserve on December 18, 2017.

New York Giants
On January 2, 2019, Golden signed a reserve/future contract with the New York Giants. He was placed on injured reserve on August 31, 2019. He was released from injured reserve with an injury settlement on September 9.

References

External links

Arizona Cardinals bio
Chicago Bears bio

1988 births
Living people
People from Yoakum County, Texas
Players of American football from Texas
American football wide receivers
West Texas A&M Buffaloes football players
Chicago Bears players
Jacksonville Jaguars players
Arizona Cardinals players
New York Giants players